Amos Myers (April 23, 1824 – October 18, 1893) was a Republican member of the U.S. House of Representatives from Pennsylvania.

Myers was born in Petersburg, Pennsylvania on April 23, 1824.  He attended a private school near Clarion, Pennsylvania, and in 1843 graduated from Allegheny College in Meadville, Pennsylvania.  He studied law, was admitted to the bar in 1846 and commenced practice in Clarion.  He held several local offices, and was appointed district attorney of Clarion County, Pennsylvania in 1847.

Myers was elected as a Republican to the Thirty-eighth Congress (March 4, 1863 – March 3, 1865).  He served as chairman of the United States House Committee on Expenditures in the Department of the Treasury during the Thirty-eighth Congress.  He resumed the practice of law in Clarion.  He moved to Kentucky and was ordained to the Baptist ministry.  He preached in Kentucky, Pennsylvania, and New York, and died in East Carleton (now Kent, New York) on October 18, 1893.  Interment in Crown Hill Cemetery in Indianapolis, Indiana.

Sources

Amos Myers at The Political Graveyard

1824 births
1893 deaths
People from Huntingdon County, Pennsylvania
Allegheny College alumni
Baptist ministers from the United States
Pennsylvania lawyers
Burials at Crown Hill Cemetery
Republican Party members of the United States House of Representatives from Pennsylvania
19th-century American politicians
19th-century American lawyers
19th-century American clergy